William & Sparkles' Magical Tales is an Australian children's television series first screened on the Nine Network on 5 March 2010. The series of half-hour episodes is created by SLR Productions for pre-school aged children.

William & Sparkles' Magical Tales follows the adventures of Sparkles the Fairy and William the Wizard, in the Enchanted Forest. Their friends include Nooshy & Pozo, Awesome Guy, Queen of the Fairies and many other guests.

Cast
 Laura Murphy as Sparkles the Fairy
 James Buckingham as William the Wizard
 Chris Lane as Pozo
 Matthew McCoy as Nooshy
 Blake Young as Awesome Guy (Seasons 1, 3, 4,5 and 6)
 Andrew Fritz as Awesome Guy (Season 2) 
 Chelsea Plumley as Queen of the Fairies
 Jay James-Moody as the Magic Doctor of the Enchanted Forest

References

External links
Omnilab Media
Ambience Entertainment

Australian children's television series
Nine Network original programming
9Go! original programming
2010 Australian television series debuts
2017 Australian television series endings
Musical television series
English-language television shows